The 18243 / 18244 Bhagat Ki Kothi–Bilaspur Express  is one of the Express trains of South East Central Railway zone which runs between Bilaspur Junction railway station of Bilaspur, city of Chhattisgarh and Bhagat Ki Kothi railway station, a suburban railway station in Jodhpur, Rajasthan.

Arrival & Departure

Train number 18243 departs from Bilaspur Junction on Monday and Tuesday at 18:20, reaching Bhagat Ki Kothi the next day at 05:00. Train number 18244 departs from Bhagat Ki Kothi on Thursday and Sunday at 00:05, reaching Bilaspur Junction the next day at 12:45.

Routes & Halts
The important halts of the train are:

 Bhatapara

Traction

As the route is yet to be fully electrified, it is hauled by a Bhilai-based WAP-7 from Bilaspur Junction up to  handing over to a Bhagat Ki Kothi-based WDP-4 / WDP-4B / WDP-4D locomotive for the remainder of the journey until Bhagat Ki Kothi.

Direction reversal
This train reverses its direction 3 times,

 
 
 .

Coach composition 
This service has six GS coaches, seven Sleeper coaches, three B1, B2, B3 coaches, three AC coaches, and two End on Generation (EOG) coaches.

Speed & Frequency
The train runs with a top speed of 130 km/h and an average speed of 55 km/h. 

Train number 18243 - Bilaspur - Bhagat Ki Kothi SF Express (PT) departs from Bilaspur junction (BSP) on Monday and Tuesday. and the last stop (station) of this train is Bhagat Ki Kothi (BGKT).

Train number 18244 - Bhagat Ki Kothi Bilaspur Express departs from Bhagat Ki Kothi (BGKT) on Thursday and Saturday. and the last stop (station) of this train is Bilaspur junction (BSP). The total distance covered by this train is 1820 KM.

References

External links
 India Rail Info

Express trains in India
Transport in Bilaspur, Chhattisgarh
Transport in Jodhpur
Rail transport in Madhya Pradesh
Rail transport in Rajasthan
Rail transport in Chhattisgarh
Railway services introduced in 2016
2016 establishments in India